Paralipsa gularis, the stored nut moth, is a moth of the family Pyralidae. It is found in Southeast Asia and is an introduced species in Western Europe.

The wingspan is 21–32 mm.

The caterpillars feed on stored nuts and seeds like walnut, almond, soybean and flax.

External links
 "Stored Nut Moth Paralipsa gularis". UKMoths. Retrieved 2 April 2018.

Tirathabini
Moths described in 1877
Moths of Asia
Moths of Europe
Moths of Japan
Taxa named by Philipp Christoph Zeller